This is a list of craters with ray systems. In the following tables, the listed coordinates and the diameter are for the crater.

Mercury
The following craters on Mercury possess ray systems.

Mars
The following craters on Mars possess ray systems (These were discovered in Thermal Emission Imaging System infrared images).

Moon

This table lists the lunar impact craters that have ray systems. Crater names followed by a letter are satellite craters associated with the primary crater of the same name.  The list is not comprehensive because there are hundreds or thousands of small craters with ray systems that are not named.  A few unnamed craters photographed during the Apollo program are included.

See also
 List of craters on the Moon

External links 
 Rayed craters on Mars